The term Vrhbosna may refer to:

 Vrhbosna, medieval fort in central Bosnia
 Vrhbosna (župa), medieval district (župa) in central Bosnia
 Vrhbosna, old Bosnian name for present day city of Sarajevo
 Archdiocese of Vrhbosna, Roman Catholic Archdiocese in Bosnia and Herzegovina
 '"Vrhbosna", periodical publication of Roman Catholic Archdiocese of Vrhbosna
 Radio Vrhbosna, radio station in Bosnia and Herzegovina
 Grand County of Vrhbosna, administrative unit in the Independent State of Croatia (1941-1945)